Operazione San Pietro (internationally released as Operation St. Peter's) is a 1967 Italian comedy film directed by Lucio Fulci. The film is a sort of unofficial sequel to Operazione San Gennaro, a successful heist-comedy film that Dino Risi had filmed the previous year.

The film was co-produced by France, where it was released as Au diable les anges (To Hell With the Angels), and West Germany, where it was released as Die Abenteuer des Kardinal Braun (The Adventure of Cardinal Brown).

Plot
Napoleon, a small-time crook, is serving time in Naples on a robbery charge. He is sprung by accident when the Baron and his two incompetent cohorts, Agonia and the Captain, tunnel under his cell, having lost their way to an expected bank vault. Napoleon escapes with his rescuers through the tunnel and discovers that the three are flat broke, despite the well-dressed appearance of the Baron. Napoleon swiftly asserts himself as leader of the group and suggests that they move to Rome for richer pickings.

On the outskirts of Rome, the gang falls in with Il Cajella, who owns a dilapidated used-car lot which Napoleon elects as his gang's hideout and Cajella as their co-conspirator/protector. At first, Napoleon's renewed criminal activates are unambitious and he is soon caught stealing a woman's purse at a local shopping center. Before the security guards can call the police, Marisa, the victim, announces that she knows him and saves him from arrest. Marisa insists on calling Napoleon "Filiberto" because he resembles her late husband.

Meanwhile, Cajella encounters the beautiful Samantha while cruising for trade at a singles bar mainly populated by wealthy older women. Cajella is unaware that Samantha belongs to a big American criminal named Joe Ventura. Elsewhere, the hungry gang attempts to raise money to buy food by offering American tourists a private view of Michaelangelo's Pieta. When a Vatican employee leaves a forklift truck unattended, Napoleon swathes the statue in a blanket and brazenly carries it on the forklift out into the streets of Rome.

Napoleon brings Marisa to the hideout to seduce her, but accidentally dislodges the sheet to reveal the Pieta. Marisa, a devout Catholic, insists that the statue be returned. Napoleon concedes but claims that he only found the statue. Napoleon and Marisa lead Vatican officials to the hideout, but Ventura and his henchmen arrive first and make off with the statue themselves. Wanted posters depicting Ventura and Cajella are distributed throughout Italy.

Ventura and his men decide to head to Sicily with Vatican police and diverse cardinals, priests, and monks in hot pursuit. Napoleon, Marisa, and the gang team up with Cardinal Braun, a Vatican official who drives like a maniac after the fleeing criminals. Braun drives off a pier and crashes the car on board Ventura's boat just as it sets off for Sicily with the statue. To everyone's surprise, Ventura hands his gun to Braun, for Ventura and Braun were old friends in the Mafia before Braun saw the light. As the boat sails away with both gangs on board, Samantha and Cajella are left behind on the pier. Samantha escapes on water skis and Cajella tries to swim after her to escape from a group of angry female clients of his waiting on the pier.

Cast 

 Lando Buzzanca as Napoleone
 Jean-Claude Brialy as Cajella
 Edward G. Robinson as Joe Ventura
 Heinz Rühmann as Cardinal Erik Braun
 Christine Barclay as Marisa
 Antonella Della Porta as Cesira
 Herbert Fux as Targout
 Wolfgang Kieling as Poulain
 Ugo Fangareggi as Agonia
 Uta Levka as Samantha
 Dante Maggio as The Captain
 Pinuccio Ardia as Il barone
 Carlo Pisacane as Epimeno

References

External links

1967 films
French crime comedy films
West German films
Commedia all'italiana
Films directed by Lucio Fulci
Films set in Rome
Films set in Vatican City
Italian heist films
Italian crime comedy films
1960s heist films
1960s Italian-language films
1960s Italian films
1960s French films